Three Wooden Crosses: The Inspirational Hits of Randy Travis is a compilation album by Randy Travis. Released in March 2009 by Word/Curb/Warner Bros., the album contains some of Travis' most popular gospel songs.

Track listing 
 "Three Wooden Crosses" (Kim Williams and Doug Johnson) – 3:22
 "Four Walls" (Don Rollins, Harry Stinson and D. Vincent Williams) – 3:43
 "Angels" (Harvey McNalley, Buck Moore and Troy Seals) – 3:46
 "Just a Closer Walk with Thee" (Traditional) – 4:38
 "In the Garden" (Charles Austin Miles) – 3:21
 "Faith in You" (Tom Douglas, Joe Henry and Matt Rollins) – 3:48
 "Love Lifted Me" (James Rowe and Howard E. Smith) – 3:11
 "Blessed Assurance" (Fanny Crosby and Phoebe P. Knapp) – 3:28
 "Softly and Tenderly" (Will L. Thompson) – 3:19
 "Raise Him Up" (Robert Wilson Royer and Melvern Rivers Rutherford II) – 4:03
 "He's My Rock, My Sword, My Shield" (Public Domain) – 2:30
 "Sweet By and By" (Joseph P. Webster and S. Fillmore Bennett) – 2:27
 "Everywhere We Go" (Michael Curtis and Randy Travis) – 2:31
 "Rise and Shine" (Michael Curtis and Randy Travis) – 3:03
 "Were You There?" (Unknown author) – 3:52
 "He's Got the Whole World in His Hands" (Traditional) – 2:19
 "Shall We Gather at the River?" (Robert Lowry) – 3:15
 "Pray for the Fish" (Phillip Moore, Dan Murph and Ray Scott) – 3:01
 "Swing Down Sweet Chariot" (Traditional) – 3:13
 "Will the Circle Be Unbroken?" (Ada R. Habershon and Charles H. Gabriel) – 3:07

Chart performance

References 

2009 greatest hits albums
Randy Travis compilation albums
Warner Records compilation albums
Albums produced by Kyle Lehning